Canada competed at the 1968 Winter Olympics in Grenoble, France. Canada has competed at every Winter Olympic Games. This was the first Winter Olympic Games in which the new Maple Leaf Flag was used to represent the country.

Medalists

Alpine skiing

Men

Men's slalom

Women

Biathlon

Men

 1 One minute added per close miss (a hit in the outer ring), two minutes added per complete miss.

Men's 4 x 7.5 km relay

 2 A penalty loop of 200 metres had to be skied per missed target.

Bobsleigh

Cross-country skiing

Men

Men's 4 × 10 km relay

Figure skating

Men

Women

Pairs

Ice hockey

Medal Round 

 Canada –  West Germany  6:1  (0:0, 4:1, 2:0)
Goalscorers: Bourbonnais 2, Cadieux, Dinnen, Mott, Huck – Kopf.
Referees: Seglin, Snětkov (URS)

 Canada –  Finland 2:5  (1:2, 0:1, 1:2)
Goalscorers: O'Shea, McMillan – Keinonen, Oksanen, J. Peltonen, Koskela, Wahlsten.
Referees: Trumble (USA), Seglin (URS)

 Canada –  East Germany 11:0  (4:0, 4:0, 3:0)
Goalscorers: Mott 4, Huck 2, Hargreaves, O'Shea, Bourbonnais, Monteith, H. Pinder.
Referees: Trumble (USA), Sillankorva (FIN)

 Canada –  USA 3:2  (1:2, 0:0, 2:0)
Goalscorers: Cadieux 2, Johnston – Pleau, Riutta.
Referees: Snětkov, Seglin (URS)

  Czechoslovakia –  Canada  2:3  (0:0, 0:3, 2:0) 
Goalscorers: Havel, Nedomanský – Huck, Bourbonnais, Cadieux. 
Referees: Trumble (USA), Sillankorva (FIN)

  Sweden –  Canada 0:3  (0:2, 0.0, 0:1)
Goalscorers: Johnston, G. Pinder, O'Shea.
Referees: Sillankorva (FIN), Kořínek (TCH)

 USSR –  Canada 5:0  (1:0, 1:0, 3:0)
Goalscorers: Firsov 2, Mišakov, Staršinov, Zimin.
Referees: Trumble (USA), Dahlberg (SWE)

Leading scorers/Awards

IIHF Award:

Contestants
 CANADA
Goaltenders: Ken Broderick, Wayne Stephenson.
Defence: Marshall Johnston, Terry O'Malley, Barry MacKenzie, Brian Glennie, Paul Conlin.
Forwards: Fran Huck, Morris Mott, Ray Cadieux,  Roger Bourbonnais, Danny O'Shea, Bill MacMillan, Gary Dineen, Ted Hargreaves, Herb Pinder, Steve Monteith, Gerry Pinder.
Coach: Jackie McLeod.

Luge

Men

Women

Ski jumping

Speed skating

Men

Women

Official Outfitter

HBC was the official outfitter of clothing for members of the Canadian Olympic team. It was HBC last Olympics until 2006.

References
 Olympic Winter Games 1968, full results by sports-reference.com

Nations at the 1968 Winter Olympics
1968
Winter Olympics